Astrid Frank (born 1945) is a retired German film and television actress. She starred in number of sex comedies during the 1970s.

Selected filmography
 The True Jacob (1960)
 A Woman for Life (1960)
 Charley's Aunt (1963)
 The Gentlemen (1965)
 Black Market of Love (1966)
 Take Off Your Clothes, Doll (1968)
 All About Women (1969)
 Salto Mortale (1969, TV series)
 La Horse (1970)
 The Bordello (1971)
 Holiday Report (1971)
 Au Pair Girls (1972)
 The Disciplined Woman (1972)
 The Associate (1979)

References

Bibliography 
 Harvey Fenton & David Flint. Ten Years of Terror: British Horror Films of the 1970s. FAB, 2001.

External links 
 

1945 births
Living people
German film actresses
German television actresses
Actresses from Berlin